Ashoka Priyantha  is a Sri Lankan politician and a member of the Parliament of Sri Lanka. He was elected from Puttalam District in 2015.He is a Member of the Sri Lanka Podujana Peramuna.

References

Living people
Sri Lankan Buddhists
Members of the 15th Parliament of Sri Lanka
Members of the 16th Parliament of Sri Lanka
Year of birth missing (living people)